is a Japanese manga series written and illustrated by Misaki Takamatsu. It has been serialized in Kodansha's Monthly Afternoon since August 2018. It has been licensed in North America for English release by Seven Seas Entertainment. An anime television series adaptation by P.A. Works is set to premiere in April 2023.

Characters

Media

Manga
Skip and Loafer is written and illustrated by Misaki Takamatsu. It has been serialized in Kodansha's Monthly Afternoon since August 25, 2018. Kodansha has collected its chapters into individual tankōbon volumes. The first volume was released on January 23, 2019. As of January 23, 2023, eight volumes have been released.

In North America, Seven Seas Entertainment announced that they had licensed the manga for English release in February 2021. The first volume was released on August 10, 2021.

Volume list

Anime
In November 2021, it was announced that the series will receive an anime television series adaptation. It will be animated by P.A. Works and written and directed by Kotomi Deai, with character designs handled by Manami Umeshita, who will also serve as chief animation director, and music composed by Takatsugu Wakabayashi. The series is set to premiere on April 4, 2023, on Tokyo MX and other networks. Crunchyroll has licensed the series.

Reception
Alongside Ranking of Kings, Skip and Loafer ranked #7 on Takarajimasha's Kono Manga ga Sugoi! list of best manga of 2020 for male readers. The series ranked #46 on the 2021 "Book of the Year" list by Da Vinci magazine.

In 2020, the series was nominated for the 13th Manga Taishō and placed 3rd with 58 points. It was also nominated for the 44th Kodansha Manga Award in the general category in 2020; it has again been nominated for the 46th edition in the same category in 2022. The manga was one of the Jury Recommended Works at the 23rd Japan Media Arts Festival in 2020.

Rebecca Silverman of Anime News Network gave the first two volumes an A−. Silverman wrote: "Skip and Loafer may not have fabulous art and it may not have an innovative story. But it does have a firm grasp of its storytelling and characters and a not inconsiderable sense of humor."

References

External links
 
 

Anime series based on manga
Crunchyroll anime
Kodansha manga
P.A.Works
Romantic comedy anime and manga
School life in anime and manga
Seinen manga
Seven Seas Entertainment titles
Slice of life anime and manga
Tokyo MX original programming
Upcoming anime television series